Suharău is a commune in Botoșani County, Western Moldavia, Romania. It is composed of six villages: Izvoare, Lișna, Oroftiana, Plevna, Smârdan and Suharău.

The Prut enters Romania in Oroftiana village.

Natives
 Mihai Chițac

References

Communes in Botoșani County
Localities in Western Moldavia
Populated places on the Prut